The men's football tournament at the 2002 Asian Games was held from 27 September to Saturday 13 October 2002 in Busan, South Korea.

Venues

Squads

Results
All times are Korea Standard Time (UTC+09:00)

Preliminary round

Group A

Group B

Group C

Group D

Group E

Group F

Second-placed teams

Knockout round

Quarterfinals

Semifinals

Bronze medal match

Gold medal match

Goalscorers

Final standing

References

RSSSF

External links
Official website

Men